Club Deportivo Onda is a Spanish football team based in Onda, Castellón, in the autonomous community of Valencia. Founded in 1950 it plays in Regional Preferente – Group 1, holding home games at Estadio La Serratella, with a capacity of 5,000 seats.

Onda was also a farm team for Villarreal CF between 2000 and 2002, and for Benidorm CF between 2009 and 2011.

Season to season

1 season in Segunda División B
34 seasons in Tercera División

External links
Official website 
Futbolme team profile 

Football clubs in the Valencian Community
Association football clubs established in 1950
Divisiones Regionales de Fútbol clubs
1950 establishments in Spain